IWC may refer to:

Organisations
Industrial Welfare Commission, Californian wage regulation body
Institute for Workers' Control, a defunct British Marxist organisation
International Water Centre, provides education and training, applied research and expert services in integrated water resource management  
International Whaling Commission, international body regulating whaling
International Wheat Council, former name of the International Grains Council
International Wolf Center, a wolf education facility based in Minnesota
Irish Wildbird Conservancy, former name of BirdWatch Ireland

Events
IAAF World Challenge, an annual global circuit of fourteen one day athletics competitions organized by the International Association of Athletics Federations (IAAF)
International Wheelset Congress, an annual international rail conference

Companies
Industrial Water Cooling, a cooling tower manufacturer in Johannesburg, South Africa
Imperial War Cabinet, a place in London, now a tourist attraction
International Watch Company, a luxury Swiss watch manufacturer

Other
Inch of water (Inches Water Column), a measure of pressure
Internet wrestling community, a nickname given to online postings or forums by fans of professional wrestling
Iowa Wesleyan College, a liberal arts college located in Mount Pleasant, Iowa
International Wrestling Cartel, a professional wrestling promotion based in Pittsburgh